God's Crucible may refer to:
 God's Crucible (1917 film), directed by Lynn Reynolds
 God's Crucible (1921 film), directed by Henry MacRae